Tore Pedersen  (born 29 September 1969) is a Norwegian retired professional footballer who played as a defender. He spent time abroad for Wimbledon, St. Pauli, Oldham Athletic, IFK Göteborg, Sanfrecce Hiroshima, Eintracht Frankfurt and Blackburn Rovers. He made 45 appearances for the Norway national team.

Career statistics

Club

International

References

External links

1969 births
Living people
Sportspeople from Fredrikstad
Norwegian footballers
Association football defenders
Norway international footballers
Norway youth international footballers
Kniksen Award winners
Eliteserien players
Allsvenskan players
Premier League players
J1 League players
Bundesliga players
Lillestrøm SK players
Fredrikstad FK players
IFK Göteborg players
SK Brann players
Oldham Athletic A.F.C. players
Sanfrecce Hiroshima players
FC St. Pauli players
Blackburn Rovers F.C. players
Eintracht Frankfurt players
Wimbledon F.C. players
Norwegian expatriate footballers
Norwegian expatriate sportspeople in Sweden
Expatriate footballers in Sweden
Expatriate footballers in England
Norwegian expatriate sportspeople in Japan
Expatriate footballers in Japan
Norwegian expatriate sportspeople in Germany
Expatriate footballers in Germany